Skunk cabbage is a common name for several plants and may refer to:

 the genus Lysichiton
 Asian skunk cabbage, Lysichiton camtschatcensis, grows in eastern Asia
 Western skunk cabbage, Lysichiton americanus, grows in western North America
 Eastern skunk cabbage, Symplocarpus foetidus, grows in eastern North America
Veratrum californicum (California corn lily, white or California false hellebore), locally called skunk cabbage, grows in western North America